Stacey Roca (born 12 September 1978 in Southport) is an English actress, known for portraying Rachel in The Office, Claudie Stephenson in Strictly Confidential and Nancy Tench in Netflix drama Mindhunter.

Background
Born in Southport, Roca spent her childhood in Johannesburg, South Africa, and then moved back to England. She attended Formby High School and did her A levels at King George V College in Southport, after which she moved to London.

Roca trained at the Webber Douglas Academy of Dramatic Art. and studied the Meisner technique with Bill Esper at the Esper Studio in New York.

Career
Roca's first professional role was a lead in the Pet Shop Boys' West End musical Closer to Heaven.

Roca made her television debut playing Rachel in The Office. Her other television credits include Murder City, Burn It, Wild at Heart, Lie with Me and Strictly Confidential. She appeared in series eight of the BBC drama Waking the Dead playing Constable, later DS, Katrina 'Kat' Howard.

Roca's film credits include Things to Do Before You're 30 (2004) and the short films The Sound of Silence and The Connoisseurs. She played a teacher in Tim Smith's short film Schoolboy, which dealt with teenagers' use of weapons. Having relocated to the United States,  Roca appeared in the season finale of CBS drama Bull, which aired May 2017. She is a series regular on the Netflix show Mindhunter, of which season 1 premiered October 2017.

Filmography

Television

Film

References

External links

Living people
1978 births
English television actresses
English stage actresses
People from Formby
Actresses from Lancashire
People educated at King George V College
Alumni of the Webber Douglas Academy of Dramatic Art